The Cypriot Futsal Cup is the annual cup competition for Cypriot futsal teams. It was founded in 1999 and is organized by the Cyprus Football Association. The competition is played under UEFA and FIFA rules. It is currently open to the teams of Cypriot First Division and Second Division.

Cup Winners
{| 
|valign="top" width=0%|

Performance by club

External links
futsalplanet.com

Cup
National futsal cups

it:Campionato cipriota di calcio a 5